The 1993 All-Ireland Under-21 Football Championship was the 30th staging of the All-Ireland Under-21 Football Championship since its establishment by the Gaelic Athletic Association in 1964.

Tyrone entered the championship as defending champions, however, they were defeated in the Ulster Championship

On 29 September 1993, Meath won the championship following a 1-8 to 0-10 defeat of Kerry in the All-Ireland final. This was their first All-Ireland title.

Results

All-Ireland Under-21 Football Championship

Semi-finals

Final

Statistics

Miscellaneous

 The All-Ireland semi-final between Meath and Derry is the first championship meeting between the two teams.

References

1993
All-Ireland Under-21 Football Championship